Potamogeton nodosus is a species of aquatic plant known by the common names longleaf pondweed  and Loddon pondweed. It is native to Eurasia and the Americas, where it is widespread and can be found in water bodies such as ponds, lakes, ditches, and streams. This is a perennial herb producing a thin, branching stem easily exceeding a meter in maximum length. The leaves are linear to widely lance-shaped and up to 15 centimeters long by 4 wide. Both floating leaves and submerged leaves are borne on long petioles, a distinguishing characteristic. The inflorescence is a spike of many small flowers arising from the water on a peduncle.

References

External links 
 Jepson Manual Treatment
 Flora of North America
 Photo gallery

nodosus
Flora of North America
Flora of South America
Flora of Europe
Flora of Asia
Plants described in 1816
Freshwater plants